Gonbaleh (also known as Gombaleh, Gumāla, and Gūn Baleh) is a village in Jolgeh Rural District, in the Central District of Asadabad County, Hamadan Province, Iran. At the 2006 census, its population was 441, in 109 families.

References 

Populated places in Asadabad County